EuroVoc is a multilingual thesaurus (controlled vocabulary) maintained by the Publications Office of the European Union and hosted on the portal Europa. It exists in the 24 official languages of the European Union (Bulgarian, Croatian, Czech, Danish, Dutch, English, Estonian, Finnish, French, German, Greek, Hungarian, Irish, Italian, Latvian, Lithuanian, Maltese, Polish, Portuguese, Romanian, Slovak, Slovene, Spanish and Swedish) plus Albanian, Macedonian and Serbian, although the user interface is not yet available in these languages.

Usage
EuroVoc is used by the European Parliament, the Publications Office of the European Union, the national and regional parliaments in Europe, some national government departments, and other European organisations. It serves as the basis for the domain names used in the European Union's terminology database: Interactive Terminology for Europe.

As an example, EuroVoc is used to technogically maintain a single consistent definition of European geographical divisions across several languages suitable for the work of the EU, as Europe is often divided into regions several different ways across different contexts.

Geographical classification

Europe is often geographically divided into regions in several different contexts with varying criteria, and so for consistency across contexts and languages, EuroVoc defines the geographical sub-regions of Europe as:

Central and Eastern Europe

Northern Europe

Southern Europe

Western Europe

See also
AGROVOC
EU Open Data Portal
Geography of Europe
Inter-Active Terminology for Europe

References

External links
 EuroVoc on the Europa web portal
 Eurovoc on EUR-Lex

Lexicography
Thesauri
Internet and the European Union
Terminology